L. nivalis may refer to:
 Leptonycteris nivalis, a bat species
 Lychnis nivalis, a species of plant in the Caryophyllaceae (pink/carnation) family
 Luzula nivalis, a species of plant in the Juncaceae (rush) family